Radical 182 or radical wind meaning "wind" is one of the 11 Kangxi radicals (214 radicals in total) composed of 9 strokes.

In the Kangxi Dictionary, there are 182 characters (out of 49,030) to be found under this radical.

In Taoist cosmology, 風 (wind) is the nature component of the Bagua diagram  Xùn.

Evolution

Derived characters

Variant forms
In the Kangxi Dictionary and modern standard Traditional Chinese as used in Taiwan, Hong Kong, and Macau, the stroke above  in the radical character  is horizontal, while it is a left-falling stroke in other languages.

Literature

External links

Unihan Database - U+98A8

182
091